Glamorgan Vale is a rural town and locality in the Somerset Region, Queensland, Australia.

Geography

The township itself is prone to flooding in times of extreme weather events as it borders the Black Snake Creek a tributary of the Brisbane River.

History

A Wesleyan Methodist church opened on Tarampa Road on Sunday 20 August 1871. It was described as a "well built slab building, on a good site, and will seat about a hundred persons". It was erected by local people.

Glamorgan Vale Post Office opened on 1 January 1872 and closed in 1972. Thomas Pratt from Somerset, England was the first postmaster.

Pratt also had the licence for the Glamorgan hotel from 1880 to 1895 and again from 1898 to 1899. He and his family settled in Ipswich, naming their home Glamorganvale. The Hotel was redeveloped and now operates as the Bottletree Hotel.

Glamorgan Vale State School opened on 12 July 1875. Glamorgan Vale State School celebrated its 140th anniversary in 2015. The school originally had a principal's house next door which was demolished and turned into a sports field.

Exploratory mining was conducted in the area in the early 2000s for natural gas which was unsuccessful.  

The area was designated for new housing growth in the 2016 draft release of the South East Queensland Regional Plan.

Amenities
There is a heritage church across from the school which is now private property.

Down from the school, there is community hall, tennis court and public park.

Glamorgan Vale is also the home to a cemetery, private airfield, pet motel and the Glamorgan Vale Water Board. 

The Glamorgan branch of the Queensland Country Women's Association meets at 725 Glamorgan Vale Road.

Education 
Glamorgan Vale State School is a government primary (Prep-6) school for boys and girls at 750 Glamorgan Vale Road. In 2017, the school had an enrolment of 68 students with 7 teachers (3 full-time equivalent) and 6 non-teaching staff (3 full-time equivalent). In 2018, the school had an enrolment of 61 students with 8 teachers (5 full-time equivalent) and 7 non-teaching staff (4 full-time equivalent).

There are no secondary schools in Glamorgan Vale. The nearest government secondary school is Lowood State High School in neighbouring Lowood to the north-west.

Attractions 
There is a scenic country road through the mountains on route from Glamorgan Vale to Lowood, a neighbouring township.

References

External links

Somerset Regional Council - official website
Glamorgan Vale State School - official website
University of Queensland: Queensland Places: Fairney View and Glamorgan Vale

Suburbs of Somerset Region
Localities in Queensland
Towns in Queensland